The PPSh-41 is a Soviet submachine gun designed by Georgy Shpagin as a cheaper and simplified alternative to the PPD-40. A common Russian nickname for the weapon is "papasha", meaning "daddy", and it was sometimes called the "burp gun" because of its high fire-rate.

The PPSh is a magazine-fed selective-fire submachine gun using an open bolt, blowback action. Made largely of stamped steel, it can be loaded with either a box or drum magazine and fires the 7.62×25mm Tokarev pistol round.

The PPSh saw extensive combat use during World War II and the Korean War; in Eastern Bloc countries, monuments celebrating the actions of the Red Army commonly feature a PPSh-41. It became one of the major infantry weapons of the Soviet Armed Forces during World War II, with about six million PPSh-41s manufactured in this period, making it the most-produced submachine gun of the war. In the form of the Chinese Type 50 (licensed copy), it continued in use with the Viet Cong as late as 1970, and remains in use with irregular militaries.

History

World War II

The impetus for the development of the PPSh came partly from the Winter War against Finland, where the Finnish Army employed the Suomi KP/-31 submachine gun as a highly effective tool for close-quarter fighting in forests and built-up urban areas. Its 71-round drum magazine was later copied and adopted by the Soviets for their PPD-40 and PPSh-41 submachine guns. The PPD-40 was subsequently rushed into mass production in 1940, but it was expensive to manufacture, both in terms of materials and labor, because it used numerous milled metal parts, particularly its receiver. Georgy Shpagin's main idea for cost reduction was to use metal stamping for the production of most parts. Shpagin created a prototype PPSh in September 1940, which also featured a simple gas compensator designed to prevent the muzzle from rising during bursts; this improved shot grouping by about 70% relative to the PPD.

The new weapon was produced in a network of factories in Moscow, with high-level local Party members made directly responsible for meeting production targets. A few hundred weapons were produced in November 1941 and another 155,000 were made during the next five months. By spring 1942, the PPSh factories were producing roughly 3,069 units a day. Soviet production figures for 1942 indicate that almost 1.5 million units were produced. Its parts (excluding the barrel) could be produced by a relatively unskilled workforce with simple equipment available in an auto repair garage or tin shop, freeing more skilled workers for other tasks. The PPSh-41 uses 87 components compared to 95 for the PPD-40 and the PPSh could be manufactured with an estimated 5.6 machining hours (later revised to 7.3 hours) compared with 13.7 hours for the PPD. Barrel production was often simplified by using barrels for the 7.62mm Mosin–Nagant: the rifle barrel was cut in half and two PPSh barrels were made from it after machining the chamber for the 7.62×25mm Tokarev cartridge.

After the German Army captured large numbers of the PPSh-41 during World War II, a program was instituted to convert the weapon to the standard German submachine gun cartridge – 9×19mm Parabellum. The Wehrmacht officially adopted the converted PPSh-41 as the "MP41(r)"; unconverted PPSh-41s were designated "MP717(r)" and supplied with 7.63×25mm Mauser ammunition (which is dimensionally identical to 7.62×25mm Tokarev, but slightly less powerful). German-language manuals for the use of captured PPShs were printed and distributed in the Wehrmacht. In addition to barrel replacement, converted PPSh-41s also had a magazine adapter installed, allowing them to use MP 40 magazines. The less powerful 9mm round generally reduces the cyclic rate of fire from 800 to 750 RPM. Modern aftermarket conversion kits based on the original Wehrmacht one also exist using a variety of magazines, including Sten magazines. Some enthusiasts have been able to make them work with the original Soviet drum and stick magazines, eliminating the adapter, as well as use of the more powerful 9×23mm Winchester ammo.

As standard, each PPSh-41 came with two factory-fitted drum magazines that were matched to the weapon with marked serial numbers. If drum magazines were mixed and used with different serial numbered PPSh-41, a loose fitting could result in poor retention and failure to feed. Drum magazines were superseded by a simpler PPS-42 box-type magazine holding 35 rounds, although an improved drum magazine made from 1 mm thick steel was also introduced in 1944.

The PPS-43 was later introduced in Soviet service in 1943, which was even more basic in its design than the PPSh, and had a more moderate rate of fire, but it did not replace the PPSh-41 during the war.

The Soviet Union also experimented with the PPSh-41 in a close air support antipersonnel role, mounting 88 of the submachine guns in forward fuselage racks on the Tu-2Sh variant of the Tupolev Tu-2 bomber.

More than five million PPSh submachine guns were produced by the end of the war. The Soviets would often equip platoons and sometimes entire companies with the weapon, giving them excellent short-range firepower. Thousands more were dropped behind enemy lines in order to equip Soviet partisans to disrupt German supply lines and communications.

Korean War

After the Second World War, the PPSh was supplied in large quantities to Soviet-aligned states and Communist guerrilla forces. During the Korean War, the Korean People's Army (KPA) and the Chinese People's Volunteer Army (PVA) fighting in Korea received massive numbers of the PPSh-41, in addition to the North Korean Type 49 and the Chinese Type 50, which were both licensed copies of the PPSh-41 with small mechanical revisions.

Though relatively inaccurate, the Chinese PPSh has a high rate of fire and was well-suited to the close-range firefights that typically occurred, especially at night. United Nations forces in defensive outposts or on patrol often had trouble returning a sufficient volume of fire when attacked by companies of infantry armed with the PPSh. Some U.S. infantry officers ranked the PPSh as the best combat weapon of the war: while lacking the accuracy of the U.S. M1 Garand and M1 carbine, it provided more firepower at short distances. Infantry captain (later general) Hal Moore, stated: "on full automatic it sprayed a lot of bullets and most of the killing in Korea was done at very close ranges and it was done quickly – a matter of who responded faster. In situations like that it outclassed and outgunned what we had. A close-in patrol fight was over very quickly and usually we lost because of it." U.S. servicemen, however, felt that their M2 carbines were superior to the PPSh-41 at the typical engagement range of 100–150 meters.

Features

The PPSh-41 fires the standard Soviet pistol and submachine gun cartridge, the 7.62×25mm Tokarev. Weighing approximately 12 pounds (5.45 kg) with a loaded 71-round drum and 9.5 pounds (4.32 kg) with a loaded 35-round box magazine. The PPSh is capable of a rate of about 1250 rounds per minute, a very high rate of fire in comparison to most other military submachine guns of World War II. It is a durable, low-maintenance weapon made of low-cost, easily obtained components, primarily stamped sheet metal and wood. The final production PPShs have top ejection and an L type rear sight that can be adjusted for ranges of 100 and 200 meters. A crude compensator is built into the barrel jacket, intended to reduce muzzle climb during automatic fire. The compensator was moderately successful in this respect, but it greatly increased the muzzle flash and report of the weapon. The PPSh also has a hinged receiver to facilitate field-stripping and cleaning the weapon.

A chrome-lined bore enables the PPSh to withstand both corrosive ammunition and long intervals between cleaning. No forward grip or forearm was provided, and the operator generally has to grasp the weapon behind the drum magazine with the supporting hand, or else hold the lower edge of the drum magazine. Though 35-round curved box magazines were available from 1942, the average Soviet infantryman in World War II carried the PPSh with the original 71-round drum magazine.

Although the PPSh drum magazine holds 71 rounds, misfeeding is likely to occur with more than about 65. In addition to feed issues, the drum magazine is slower and more complicated to load with ammunition than the later 35-round box magazine that increasingly supplemented the drum after 1942. While holding fewer rounds, the box magazine does have the advantage of providing a superior hold for the supporting hand. Although the PPSh is equipped with a sliding bolt safety, the weapon's open-bolt design still presents a risk of accidental discharge if the gun is dropped on a hard surface.

Users

Current
 
 
 : Made licensed copies under the designation "Type 49", which date back to the Korean War.
 Russian separatist forces in Donbas: Limited usage in the beginning of the War in Donbas.

Former
 : Formerly in service with the Afghan Army, until the 1980s. Also used by various self-defense groups.
 
: Made licensed copies under the designation "Type 50".
 
 
 : Used during and after WWII until succeeded by the vz. 58.
 : Used by the East German Grenztruppen der DDR and the Kampfgruppen der Arbeiterklasse This weapon became iconic especially due to its presence during the construction of the Berlin Wall being used by both the KdA and GT. Designated "MPi41" in DDR service, the PPSh-41 was gradually replaced by the AK-47 beginning in 1960.
  Estonia: Estonian partisans used captured SMGs against the Soviets in 1941.
 : Used captured examples.
 : Used during civil conflicts in 1990s.
 
 : Used by the PAIGC in the Guinea-Bissau War of Independence
 : Captured and reissued PPSh-41s in the early 1940s. Produced a local version in the early 1950s called the "7.62mm Géppisztoly 48.Minta", or simply "48m".

 Iran: In January 1943, the Iranian government and the Soviet Union signed a deal to produce the PPSh-41 in Iran under license and deliver a number of those submachine guns to the Soviet Union. Limited numbers of the PPSh-41 were produced and the production line was closed before World War Two ended. After the end of the war unknown numbers were produced and were used by Shahrbani  and the military.The local version used a tangent rear sight.
 
  Italian Partisans: Used examples captured from German soldiers
 
: Used by Latvian partisans against Soviets in 1940s.
  Lebanese National Movement
 
 
 : Used captured guns, and also converted some to 9×19mm Luger under the designation "MP41r".
 North Vietnam: Viet Minh, Viet Cong and North Vietnamese Army used PPSh-41 variants, including the K-50M license-built copy, and the Chinese Type 50.
 : It was used by the First Polish Army. After the war, it was made under license as the "7.62 mm pm wz.41" by Łucznik Arms Factory. 
 : Captured and reissued PPSh-41 submachine guns during 1941–1944. Made licensed copies during the 1950s at Cugir Arms Plant under the designation "PM PPȘ Md. 1952".
 
 
 : Captured from North Korean and Chinese during the Korean war.
 : In service with the Soviet Army in 1942.
 : Locally produced a variant known as the M49 Submachine gun.

Variants

 Type 50: A Chinese-made version of the PPSh-41. Unlike its Soviet counterpart, it only accepts column-type box magazines. Although new reports have suggested that due to various drum magazine dimensions used, some can be used while others cannot be used at all.
 Type 49: A North Korean made version of the PPSh-41. This model only accepts drum-based magazines.
 K-50M: A Vietnamese-made submachine gun based on the Type 50s supplied by China during the Vietnam War. Produced between 1958 and 1964. The chief difference is that the cooling sleeve of the K-50 was truncated to three inches (76 mm), the front sight based on the AK-47's front sight and a foresight based on that of the French MAT-49 was attached to the front of the barrel. Modifications include the addition of a pistol grip, a steel wire-made stock and the shortened barrel. The changes resulted in a weight of 3.4 kg (7.5 lb), making K-50M lighter than the PPSh-41 by 500 g (1.1 lb). The weapon uses a 35-round stick magazine, but the 71-round drum magazine can be used if the stock is fully extended.
 MP41(r): A captured PPSh-41 converted to 9×19mm Parabellum caliber for use by German forces.
 MP717(r): A captured, unconverted PPSh-41 placed in German service and supplied with 7.63×25mm Mauser ammunition
 M-49: A Yugoslavian produced variant of the PPSh-41 design, which utilizes a round tube for the receiver and a round bolt styled after the Beretta Model 38.
 PPS-50: A semi-automatic manufactured by Pietta. A non-restricted firearm in .22LR ammunition. The box magazine holds 30 and the drum magazine holds 50. It is cosmetically similar to the PPSh-41, although the two share no other features.
 VPO-135: A semi-automatic version of the PPSh-41 from Russia.
 LDT PPSh-41: A semi-automatic-only clone of the PPSh-41. This variant with its fixed wooden stock is manufactured by Luxembourg Defence Technology for the civilian European sport shooting market.
 SKL-41: A semi-automatic version of the PPSh-41 which became available on the German market in 2008. This version is converted to fire the 9×19mm Parabellum cartridge. Aside from replicas of its original magazines, it also accepts MP 40 magazines.
 IO SR-41: A semi-automatic version of the PPSh-41 sold by American company InterOrdnance and manufactured by A. A. Arms. The barrel on this version extends past the shroud and is non-removable. Most were made of surplus PPSh parts, however many enthusiasts criticized the gun for dubious quality.
 Additional semi-auto versions for the American market made by Wiselite and TNW. They were similar to IO SR-41 but had the shroud extend along with the barrel and were much more well received quality wise.
Šokac : A Croatian version of the PPSH-41, produced in the 1990s for use in the Croatian War of Independence. Using a metal folding stock and a square receiver, it doesn't look like a PPSH-41 appearance wise, but mechanically the gun is a copy of the PPSH-41. The Šokac was produced because of the lack of arms the Croatians were facing, and turned to producing simple small arms to fix this issue.

References

Bibliography

External links

 Video of PPSh being fired with box and drum magazine
 Video of PPSh being fired in burst with 9 mm conversion
 17 photos of PPSh-41 and its parts
 Photographs of the markings present on different variations of PPSH-41 guns and their clones.

7.62×25mm Tokarev submachine guns
Submachine guns of the Soviet Union
Vyatskiye Polyany Machine-Building Plant products
Weapons and ammunition introduced in 1941
Cold War firearms of the Soviet Union
World War II infantry weapons of the Soviet Union
World War II submachine guns